Nightmare on the 13th Floor is a 1990 American made-for-television thriller film which was originally shown on the USA Network on Halloween 1990. It stars Michele Greene as the travel writer Elaine Kalisher, James Brolin as Dr. Alan Lanier and Louise Fletcher as Letti Gordon.

Plot
The Wessex Hotel in Los Angeles is a Victorian hotel, built in 1898 at a height of 16 floors, including a 13th floor. Early in its history, serial killer Avery Block brought his friends to the 13th floor of the Wessex where he proceeded to kill them with a fire ax hoping to achieve immortality by the taking of others' lives. Due to the murders, the 13th floor was sealed off in October 1901 and a frieze was erected around the building covering the floor. Ninety years later, Traveler's Review magazine sends Elaine Kalisher to write a travel article.

References

External links
 
Nightmare on the 13th Floor Online

1990 television films
1990 films
1990 thriller films
USA Network original films
Films directed by Walter Grauman
American thriller television films
1990s American films
1990s English-language films